The Fitzgerald Historic District is a residential historic district located southeast of the central business district of Fort Smith, Arkansas. The neighborhood was developed after about 1906, as an area of affordable homes for working and middle class residents. It was built mainly on land sold of by Bishop Edward Fitzgerald of the local Roman Catholic diocese. Most of the buildings in the district are modestly scaled and decorated examples of Revival styles popular in the first three decades of the 20th century. The district is adjacent to the Fishback Neighborhood Historic District, which was developed about the same time.

The district was listed on the National Register of Historic Places in 2018.

See also
National Register of Historic Places listings in Sebastian County, Arkansas

References

Victorian architecture in Arkansas
Buildings and structures in Fort Smith, Arkansas
Historic districts on the National Register of Historic Places in Arkansas
National Register of Historic Places in Sebastian County, Arkansas